Arti Mehra was Mayor of Municipal Corporation of Delhi (MCD) from 2007 to 2009. She was replaced by Prithvi Raj Swahney. She represents the Hauz Khaz ward in South Delhi for the Bharatiya Janata Party (BJP). She was born in Nangal in the Indian state of Punjab, and graduated from the Miranda House. She had done a course in marketing in the United States. She had previously served as the chairperson of health committee in MCD.

In the 2013 Delhi state assembly elections, Mehra lost to Somnath Bharti of the Aam Admi Party by nearly 8,000 votes. She also represented India in the United Nations on climate change.

References

Mayors of Delhi
Women mayors of places in Delhi
Living people
Delhi University alumni
People from Rupnagar district
Bharatiya Janata Party politicians from Delhi
21st-century Indian women politicians
21st-century Indian politicians
Year of birth missing (living people)